The International School of the Stockholm Region (ISSR) is a school in Stockholm, Sweden. It is located on Bohusgatan in Skanstull on the island of Södermalm. The school offers the International Baccalaureate Diploma Programme, and is an IB World School and a UN School.

History
The school was founded in 1999 by Stockholm Municipality as IB School South, and was renamed in 2012 to its current name.

Curriculum
The International Baccalaureate Primary Years Programme (PYP) - for students aged 3 to 12 focuses on the development of the whole child in the classroom and in the world outside.

The International Baccalaureate Middle Years Programme (MYP) - for students aged 11 to 16 - provides a framework of academic challenge and life skills, achieved through embracing and transcending traditional school subjects.

The International Baccalaureate Diploma Programme (DP) - for students aged 16 to 19 - is a demanding two-year curriculum leading to final examinations and a qualification that is welcomed by leading universities around the world.

References

Schools in Stockholm
International Baccalaureate schools in Sweden
Gymnasiums (school) in Sweden
Education in Stockholm
International schools in Sweden